David W. Kendall (February 11, 1903 – December 27, 1976) was an American attorney who served as the White House Counsel to President Dwight D. Eisenhower from 1958 to 1961.

References

1903 births
1976 deaths
People from Indianapolis
White House Counsels
Michigan Republicans